
Gmina Firlej is a rural gmina (administrative district) in Lubartów County, Lublin Voivodeship, in eastern Poland.

Neighbouring gminas
Gmina Firlej is bordered by the gminas of Kamionka, Kock, Lubartów, Michów and Ostrówek.

Villages
The gmina contains the following villages having sołectwo status: Baran, Bykowszczyzna, Czerwonka Poleśna, Czerwonka-Gozdów, Firlej, Kunów, Łukówiec, Majdan Sobolewski, Nowy Antonin, Pożarów, Przypisówka, Serock, Sobolew, Sobolew-Kolonia, Stary Antonin, Sułoszyn, Wola Skromowska, Wólka Mieczysławska, Wólka Rozwadowska and Zagrody Łukówieckie.

See also
Firlej Lake

References

Polish official population figures 2006

Firlej
Lubartów County